Tales of the Arabian Nights is a 1996 pinball machine produced by Williams. The game is based on the stories of One Thousand and One Nights and features a blue jinn. The marketing slogan is "Your Wish is Granted".<ref name=openkqm>{{cite web| url=http://www.ipdb.org/machine.cgi?id=3824 | title=Internet Pinball Machine Database: Williams 'Tales of the Arabian Nights | date=June 11, 2012}}</ref>

Description
Players can experience 7 Tales of the Arabian Nights that includes a travel around the ancient city of Baghdad, flying with the magic carpet and battling the evil genie. Rubbing the magic lamp conjure good genies that help to rescue the princess. The game uses a vertical magnet diverter that grabs the ball and hurls it back at the player for more suspense as an industry first. The game also includes spikes that rise up and save the ball when the shooting stars are summoned.

Digital versionsTales of the Arabian Nights was available for free as a licensed table of The Pinball Arcade for several platforms during the first six years of its availability, before FarSight Studios lost the license to make digital versions of Williams pinball tables.  It is one of three dot-matrix tables exclusively available in the PlayStation 3 and Xbox 360 versions of FarSight's Pinball Hall of Fame: The Williams Collection.  Prior to these two games, it was included in the 2001 computer game Williams Pinball Classics.

After Arabian Nights was removed from The Pinball Arcade in the summer of 2018 due to the loss of FarSight's Williams license, the table made another digital appearance as downloadable content for Pinball FX 3 and an unlockable table in the Williams Pinball mobile app for iOS and Android as part of the fifth wave of Zen Studios' curation of Williams tables, which began in the fall of 2018 after Zen Studios acquired the license for digital Williams tables.

See alsoGenie''

References

External links
Pinball.org Tales of the Arabian Nights rule sheet

Williams pinball machines
Works based on One Thousand and One Nights
1996 pinball machines